The name Itatí comes from Guaraní, but there is disagreement as to its exact meaning; ita- undoubtedly corresponds to the Guaraní word for "stone" (appearing in a number of other toponyms, such as Itaipu), while the last part could refer to (moro)ti ("white") or ty  ("point").

Itatí, Corrientes
Itatí Department
Our Lady of Itatí
Itatí, villa miseria near La Plata
Itatí Cantoral
female name

Guaraní words and phrases